Radio Gradačac or is a Bosnian local public radio station, broadcasting from Gradačac, Bosnia and Herzegovina.

It was launched on 6 April 1965 by the municipal council of Gradačac. In Yugoslavia and in SR Bosnia and Herzegovina, it was part of local/municipal Radio Sarajevo network affiliate.

This radio station broadcasts a variety of programs such as local news, music, sport and talk shows. Program is mainly produced in Bosnian language.

Estimated number of potential listeners of Radio Gradačac is around 138,619. Radiostation is also available in municipalities of Bosanska Posavina, Zenica-Doboj Canton, Brčko District and in neighboring Croatia.

Radiostation is also available via IPTV platform Moja TV on channel 290.

Frequencies
 Gradačac

See also 
List of radio stations in Bosnia and Herzegovina

References

External links 
 www.fmscan.org
 www.radiogradacac.ba
 Communications Regulatory Agency of Bosnia and Herzegovina

Gradačac
Radio stations established in 1965